Dhobi known in some places as Dhoba or Rajaka are Indo-Aryan and Dravidian tribe group in India and the greater Indian subcontinent.

Historical People 
Saints
Virabhadra - Fierce and fearsome form of the Hindu god Shiva 
Tiru Kurippu Thonda Nayanar - One of the 63 Nayanmars 
Bogar - One of the 18 Siddhars

Bureaucracy 
Vivek Ram Chaudhari
Roopa Divakar Moudgil
Anil Kant

Politics 
President & Prime Ministers
Ranasinghe Premadasa - 3rd President of Sri Lanka (1989–1993) and Prime Minister (1978–1989) 

Ministers & MP
Sajith Premadasa
Shyam Rajak
Gulabo Devi
Basavaraju Saraiah
Arjun Charan Sethi
Rajesh Diwakar
Lalit Mohan Suklabaidya
Dumar Lal Baitha
Kameshwar Baitha
Kailash Baitha
Kamal Kishor
Yashvir Singh
Jaya Prada
Umakant Rajak
Dumar Lal Baitha
Hemlata Divakar
MLA's & MLC's
M.Ethirajulu

Social Reformers 
Gadge Maharaj - Indian mendicant-saint and social reformer
Chakali Ilamma - Indian revolutionary leader during the Telangana Rebellion

Warriors & Kings 
Madivala Machideva - A great warrior of the 12th century,he fought valiantly against King Bijjala's army to protect manuscripts of Vachanas
Chintamoni Dhoba - The ruler of Dhalbhum region and established capital at Ambikanagar
Neelasothaiyan - The Commander-in-Chief of King Periyathambiran

Military 
 Rosli Dhobi - Malay Sarawakian nationalist from Sibu, Sarawak, Malaysia during the British crown colony era in that state
 Ram Chander - MVC was a civilian who was awarded the Mahavir Chakra during the Indo-Pakistani War of 1947

Freedom fighters 
 Nathu Dhobi - To lead the Jallianwala Bagh struggle
 A. M. Saravanam - Indian Congress politician.

Sports 
Mamata Kanojia
Rahul Kanojia
Shyamji Kanojia

Cinema 
Usha Rajak
Rajkumar Kanojia
Rokesh
Bullet Prakash
Yogi Babu
Vijaya Nirmala

Business 
 V. K. Thanabalan - Chairman & Managing Director of Madura Travel Sservice (P) Ltd, Editor & Publisher madura welcome

References 

Lists of politicians